Teri Raza is a Pakistani television series that first aired on ARY Digital on 8 July 2017 and ended on 2 February 2018. It was produced by Fahad Mustafa and Dr.Ali Kazmi under their banner Big Bang Entertainment.

Plot
The story revolves around the lives of Suhana, Imtiaz and Rameez.

Cast
Sanam Baloch as Suhana
Sarmad Khoosat as Imtiyaz
Shehroz Sabzwari as Rameez
Shaheen Khan as Zarmeen Bibi: Suhana's mother
Tanveer Jamal as Suhana's father
Tara Mahmood as Rameez's mother
Saife Hassan as Rameez's father
Ayesha Khan as Suhana's grandmother
Hajra Yamin as Rameez's sister
Shamim Hilaly as Imtiyaz's mother and Suhana's aunt

Soundtrack

The music was composed by Ghulam Qadir Pundit with lyrics by Hafeez Hoshiyarpuri.

Track listing

References

External links
 

Pakistani drama television series
2017 Pakistani television series debuts
2018 Pakistani television series endings
Urdu-language television shows
ARY Digital original programming